2012 in sports various events were held, notably the Summer Olympics were held in London, United Kingdom.

Events by month

January

February

March

April

May

June

July

August

September

October

November

December

Alpine skiing

American football

 Super Bowl XLVI – the New York Giants (NFC) won 21–17 over the New England Patriots (AFC)
Location: Lucas Oil Stadium
Attendance: 68,658
MVP: Eli Manning, QB (New York)
 January 9 – BCS National Championship Game in New Orleans (2011 season):
 The Alabama Crimson Tide won 21-0 over the LSU Tigers to win the 2012 BCS National Championship Game
 March 21 - former Indianapolis Colts quarterback Peyton Manning signs a 5-year, $96 million deal with the Denver Broncos, after considering signing with teams such as the Miami Dolphins, Arizona Cardinals, Seattle Seahawks, and Tennessee Titans. Manning spent his first 13 years with the Colts, leading them to their 2nd Super Bowl title in 2007 and after going 2-14 in 2011 and earning the No. 1 pick in the 2012 Draft, Manning was released by the Colts 13 days earlier, and sat out that whole season due to undergoing neck surgeries. In a move that shocked both the media and fans, sophomore quarterback Tim Tebow would be traded to the New York Jets the next day, and just 2 months after he led the 4th seeded Broncos to a playoff win and go 7-4 as a starter. This signing is tied with the New Orleans Saints' signing of Drew Brees in 2006 as the greatest free agency signing in NFL history.

Aquatics
January 16–29: 2012 Men's European Water Polo Championship in Eindhoven, Netherlands
January 18–28: 2012 Women's European Water Polo Championship in Eindhoven, Netherlands
February 20–26: 2012 FINA Diving World Cup in London, U.K.
May 14–27: 2012 European Aquatics Championships in Antwerp and Eindhoven
Aquatics at the 2012 Olympics in London, United Kingdom:
Swimming 28 July - 10 August. American swimmer Michael Phelps became the most decorated Olympic athlete of all time, by surpassing soviet gymnast Larisa Latynina. Phelps has won 22 Olympic medals (18 gold, 2 silver and 2 bronze) .
Diving 29 July - 11 August
Water Polo
Synchronized Swimming 5–10 August
2012 FINA Swimming World Cup in eight different cities in October and November:
 October 2–3 Dubai, United Arab Emirates 
 October 6–7 Doha, Qatar 
 October 13–14 Stockholm, Sweden 
 October 17–18 Moscow, Russia 
 October 20–21 Berlin, Germany 
 November 2–3 Beijing, China 
 November 6–7 Tokyo, Japan 
 November 10–11 Singapore .
Kenneth To from  won the men's race, while Katinka Hosszú from  won the women's race

Association football

 2012 Africa Cup of Nations in Gabon and Equatorial Guinea (final held in Libreville)
 Champions:  (first title); Runners-up: ; Third place: .
 UEFA Euro 2012 in Poland and Ukraine (final was held in Kyiv)
  defeated  4–0 in the final to successfully defend their 2008 Euro title. This is Spain's third Euro title win overall. It also made Spain the first men's team ever to win three consecutive major international competitions (Euro 2008, 2010 World Cup, Euro 2012).
 2012 FIFA U-17 Women's World Cup in Baku, Azerbaijan
 Champions:  (first title); Runners-up: ; Third place: .
 2012 FIFA U-20 Women's World Cup in Japan (final held in Tokyo)
 Champions:  (third title); Runners-up: ; Third place: .
 2011–12 OFC Champions League
  Auckland City FC defeats  AS Tefana 3–1 on aggregate. Auckland City will represent the OFC region in the 2012 FIFA Club World Cup.
 2011–12 CONCACAF Champions League
 In a matchup of two  teams, Monterrey defeated Santos Laguna 3–2 on aggregate. Monterrey will represent the CONCACAF region in the 2012 FIFA Club World Cup.
 2011–12 UEFA Champions League (final held in Munich)
  Chelsea defeated  Bayern Munich 4–3 on penalties, after a 1–1 draw after extra time. Chelsea will represent the UEFA region in the 2012 FIFA Club World Cup.
 2012 Copa Libertadores
  Corinthians defeated  Boca Juniors 4–1 on points in the two-legged final. Corinthians will represent the CONMEBOL region in the 2012 FIFA Club World Cup.
 2012 AFC Champions League (final held in Ulsan)
  Ulsan Hyundai defeated  Al-Ahli 3–0. Ulsan Hyundai will represent the AFC region in the 2012 FIFA Club World Cup.
 2012 CAF Champions League
  Al-Ahly defeated  Espérance ST 3–2 on aggregate in the two-legged final. Al-Ahly will represent the CAF region in the 2012 FIFA Club World Cup.
 2012 FIFA Club World Cup in Japan
  Corinthians defeated  Chelsea 1–0 to claim its second title.

Athletics

March 9–11: 2012 IAAF World Indoor Championships in Istanbul, Turkey
July 10–15: 2012 World Junior Championships in Athletics in Barcelona, Spain
June 27 – July 1: 2012 European Athletics Championships in Helsinki, Finland

Badminton

Baseball

 The Miami Marlins, known as the Florida Marlins until November 11, 2011, opened their new stadium, Marlins Park, on April 4 against the defending World Series champion St. Louis Cardinals.
 October 24–28: In the World Series, the San Francisco Giants swept the Detroit Tigers 4–0, with Giants third baseman Pablo Sandoval named MVP. It was the Giants' second World Series victory in three years.
 October 27–November 5: In the Japan Series, the Yomiuri Giants defeated the Hokkaido Nippon-Ham Fighters 4–2, with Giants starting pitcher Tetsuya Utsumi named MVP.

Basketball

NBA Finals
Miami Heat win four games to one over the Oklahoma City Thunder
 October 27 : The Oklahoma City Thunder trade James Harden, Cole Aldrich, Daequan Cook, and Lazar Hayward to the Houston Rockets in exchange for Kevin Martin, Jeremy Lamb, two first round picks (which became Steven Adams in 2013 and Mitch McGary in 2014), and a second round pick that became Alex Abrines in 2013, a trade that was heavily criticised by fans and the media as many believe the Thunder would've won a title or possibly become the NBA's next dynasty had they kept the trio of Harden, Russell Westbrook, and Kevin Durant. Having played there until 2021, Harden had his best years in Houston, leading them to 7 straight playoff appearances, the Western Conference Finals in 2015 and 2018, won the 2017-18 MVP award, and in 2018-19, led the Rockets to 32 straight 30-plus point games.
Events
 Barclays Center, a new arena in Brooklyn, opened late in 2012. The New Jersey Nets revealed in 2011 that they will become the Brooklyn Nets starting in the 2012–13 season, when they will begin playing in the new building.
 2012 NCAA Men's Division I Basketball Tournament – The University of Kentucky wins its eighth national title, defeating the University of Kansas 67–59 at the Mercedes-Benz Superdome in New Orleans.
 2012 NCAA Women's Division I Basketball Tournament – Baylor University wins its second national title, defeating the University of Notre Dame 80–61 at the Pepsi Center in Denver. The Lady Bears finish the season 40–0, becoming the first team in NCAA basketball history of either sex to win 40 games in a season.
 2011–12 Euroleague Basketball. Final Four in Istanbul, Turkey - Olympiacos B.C. won, defeating PBC CSKA Moscow.
 South American Basketball Championship 2012 in Argentina - Argentina won, defeating Venezuela in the final.

Biathlon

Bowling

 January 29 : Mike Fagan won his first major championship, in claiming the USBC Masters title.
 February 26 : Pete Weber won his record 5th U.S. Open in dramatic fashion over Mike Fagan.
 April 15: Sean Rash broke his title slump in winning his second major in the PBA Tournament of Champions.

Canadian football

 November 23 – 48th Vanier Cup in Toronto: Laval Rouge et Or 37, McMaster Marauders 14
 November 25 – 100th Grey Cup in Toronto:  Toronto Argonauts 35, Calgary Stampeders 22

Cricket
2012 Under19 Cricket World Cup was held in Australia.
 defeated  in the final and clinched their third title.
2012 ICC World Twenty20 was held in Sri Lanka.
 defeated  in the final and clinched their first title.

Curling

Figure skating

Floorball
 Men's World Floorball Championships
 Champion: 
 Women's under-19 World Floorball Championships
 Champion: 
 Champions Cup
 Men's champion:  Storvreta IBK
 Women's champion:  IKSU

Freestyle skiing

Futsal
January 31 – February 11: 2012 UEFA Futsal Championship in Croatia (final held in Zagreb)
November 2 – November 18: 2012 FIFA Futsal World Cup in Thailand (final to be held in Bangkok)

Golf

 September 25 – September 30: 2012 Ryder Cup in Medinah, Illinois, United States - won by Europe.

Handball

 2012 Pan American Men's Handball Championship in Argentina
January 15 – January 29: 2012 European Men's Handball Championship in Serbia
December 3 – December 16: 2012 European Women's Handball Championship in Serbia

Horse racing
Steeplechases
 Cheltenham Gold Cup  – Synchronised
 Grand National - Neptune Collonges

Flat races
 Dubai, United Arab Emirates: Dubai World Cup – Monterosso
 English Triple Crown:
 2,000 Guineas Stakes – Camelot
 Epsom Derby - Camelot
 St. Leger Stakes – Encke
 United States Triple Crown:
 Kentucky Derby – I'll Have Another
 Preakness Stakes – I'll Have Another
 Belmont Stakes – Union Rags
 Breeders' Cup:
 Day 1:
 Juvenile Sprint: Hightail
 Marathon: Calidoscopio
 Juvenile Fillies Turf: Flotilla
 Juvenile Fillies: Beholder
 Filly & Mare Turf: Zagora
 Ladies' Classic: Royal Delta
 Day 2:
 Juvenile Turf: George Vancouver
 Dirt Mile: Tapizar
 Filly & Mare Sprint: Groupie Doll
 Turf Sprint: Mizdirection
 Juvenile: Shanghai Bobby
 Turf: Little Mike
 Sprint: Trinniberg
 Mile: Wise Dan
 Classic: Fort Larned

Ice hockey

Kickboxing
The following is a list of major noteworthy kickboxing events during 2012 in chronological order.

|-
|align=center style="border-style: none none solid solid; background: #e3e3e3"|Date
|align=center style="border-style: none none solid solid; background: #e3e3e3"|Event
|align=center style="border-style: none none solid solid; background: #e3e3e3"|Alternate Name/s
|align=center style="border-style: none none solid solid; background: #e3e3e3"|Location
|align=center style="border-style: none none solid solid; background: #e3e3e3"|Attendance
|align=center style="border-style: none none solid solid; background: #e3e3e3"|Notes
|-align=center
|January 28
|It's Showtime 2012 in Leeuwarden
|It's Showtime 54
| Leeuwarden, Netherlands
|
|
|-align=center
|February 25
|SuperKombat World Grand Prix I 2012
|SuperKombat World Grand Prix I
| Podgorica, Montenegro
|
|
|-align=center
|March 10
|Cro Cop Final Fight
|K-1 Final Fight
| Zagreb, Croatia
|
|
|-align=center
|March 23
|United Glory 15
|
| Moscow, Russia
|
|
|-align=center
| May 27
|SLAMM: Nederland vs. Thailand VII
|SLAMM: Nederland vs. Thailand 7
| Almere, Netherlands
|
|
|-align=center
|June 30
|Music Hall & BFN Group present: It's Showtime 57 & 58
|It's Showtime 57 & 58
| Brussels, Belgium
|
|
|-align=center

Lacrosse

May 19: Rochester Knighthawks defeat the Edmonton Rush in Rochester to win their third MILL/NLL title.
May 27: Northwestern defeats Syracuse 8–6 in the final of the NCAA women's tournament. It is the Wildcats' seventh national title, all in the last eight years.
May 28: Loyola defeats in-state rival Maryland 9–3 in the final of the NCAA men's tournament. It is the first national title for the Greyhounds.

Luge

Mixed martial arts
The following is a list of major noteworthy MMA events by month.

January

1/7 — Strikeforce: Rockhold vs. Jardine

1/14 — UFC 142: Aldo vs. Mendes

1/20 — UFC on FX: Guillard vs. Miller

1/27 — MFC 32 - Bitter Rivals

1/28 — UFC on Fox: Evans vs. Davis

February

2/4 — UFC 143: Diaz vs. Condit

2/11 — ONE Fighting Championship: Battle of Heroes

2/15 — UFC on Fuel TV: Sanchez vs. Ellenberger

2/25 — UFC 144: Edgar vs. Henderson

2/25 — KSW 18: Unfinished Sympathy

March

3/2 — UFC on FX: Alves vs. Kampmann

3/3 — Strikeforce: Tate vs. Rousey

3/16 — M-1 Challenge 31 - Monson vs. Oleinik

3/24 — M-1 Belarus 16 - Belarus Fighting Championship

3/31 — ONE Fighting Championship: War of the Lions

April

4/14 — UFC on Fuel TV: Gustafsson vs. Silva

4/21 — UFC 145: Jones vs. Evans

May

5/4 — MFC 33 - Collision Course

5/5 — UFC on Fox: Diaz vs. Miller

5/12 — KSW 19: Pudzianowski vs. Sapp

5/15 — UFC on Fuel TV: Korean Zombie vs. Poirier

5/19 — Strikeforce: Barnett vs. Cormier

5/26 – UFC 146: dos Santos vs. Mir

June

6/1 — The Ultimate Fighter: Live Finale

6/8 — UFC on FX: Johnson vs. McCall 2

6/21 — M-1 Global - Fedor vs. Rizzo

6/22 — UFC on FX: Maynard vs. Guida

6/23 — UFC 147: Silva vs. Franklin II

6/23 — ONE Fighting Championship: Destiny of Warriors

July

7/7 — UFC 148: Silva vs. Sonnen II

7/11 — UFC on Fuel TV: Muñoz vs. Weidman

7/14 — Strikeforce: Rockhold vs. Kennedy

7/21 — UFC 149: Faber vs. Barão

August

8/4 — UFC on Fox: Shogun vs. Vera

8/10 — MFC 34 - Total Recall

8/11 — UFC 150: Henderson vs. Edgar II

8/18 — Strikeforce: Rousey vs. Kaufman

8/31 — ONE Fighting Championship: Pride of a Nation

September

9/1 — UFC 151: Jones vs. Henderson

9/15 — KSW 20: Fighting Symphonies

9/22 — UFC 152: Jones vs. Belfort

9/29 — UFC on Fuel TV: Struve vs. Miocic

9/29 — Strikeforce: Melendez vs. Healy

9/30 — M-1 Challenge 34 - Emelianenko vs. Gluhov

October

10/5 — UFC on FX: Browne vs. Bigfoot

10/6 — ONE Fighting Championship: Rise of Kings

10/13 — UFC 153: Silva vs. Bonnar

10/26 — MFC 35 - Explosive Encounter

November

11/3 — Strikeforce: Cormier vs. Mir

11/10 — UFC on Fuel TV: Franklin vs. Le

11/17 — UFC 154: St-Pierre vs. Condit

December

12/1 — KSW 21: Ultimate Explanation

12/8 — UFC on Fox: Henderson vs. Diaz

12/14 — UFC on FX: Sotiropoulos vs. Pearson

12/15 — The Ultimate Fighter: Team Carwin vs. Team Nelson Finale

12/29 – UFC 155: Dos Santos vs. Velasquez 2

Motorsport

Nordic skiing

Rink hockey
2012 the 50th Rink Hockey European Championship
2012 Rink hockey World Club Championship the 4th Rink hockey World Club Championship, Argentine
2012 Rink Hockey Ladies World Championship, the 11th Ladies Rink Hockey World Championship, in Argentine
2012 B-Rink Hockey World Championship
2012 Rink Hockey American Championship

Road cycling
May 5 – May 27: 2012 Giro d'Italia
Ryder Hesjedal won the Giro, becoming the first Canadian to win a Grand Tour.
June 30 – July 22: 2012 Tour de France
Bradley Wiggins won the Tour, becoming the first British to win a Grand Tour.
August 18 – September 9: 2012 Vuelta a España
Alberto Contador won the title for the second time after his first success in 2008.
September 15 – September 23: 2012 UCI Road World Championships in Limburg, Netherlands

Rowing
 2012 World Rowing Championships will be held at Plovdiv, Bulgaria between August 15 - August 19.

Rugby league

2012 Challenge Cup - Warrington Wolves win, defeating Leeds Rhinos in the final.
2012 European Cup - the England Knights won.
2012 New South Wales Cup season
2012 New Zealand rugby league season
2012 National League Cup
2012 RFL Championship
2012 State of Origin series –  Queensland defeats  New South Wales 2–1 in the best-of-3 series, extending the northerners' all-time record for consecutive State of Origin wins to seven.
Super League XVII –  Leeds Rhinos defeat  Warrington Wolves 26–18 in the Grand Final to claim their second consecutive championship and fifth in the last six seasons.
2012 USARL season
Leeds Rhinos win the 2012 World Club Challenge

Rugby union

February 4 – 17 March: Six Nations Championship
  win the championship for the 25th time, also claiming their 11th Grand Slam and 20th Triple Crown.
 May 18: Amlin Challenge Cup Final at The Stoop, London:
  Biarritz defeat  Toulon 21–18 to claim their first Challenge Cup title and first European trophy.
 May 19: Heineken Cup Final at Twickenham, London
  Leinster crush  Ulster 42–14 for their third Heineken Cup, becoming only the second club to successfully defend a Heineken Cup title and the first ever to win the Cup three times in four years.
IRB Sevens World Series:
New Zealand claim their second consecutive series crown and tenth overall.
 June 4–22: 2012 IRB Junior World Championship in Cape Town and Stellenbosch, South Africa
This was the first title for South Africa. It was also the first time in the competition's five-year history in which New Zealand did not claim the title.
 June 16–30: 2012 IRB Junior World Rugby Trophy in Salt Lake City, United States
 August 4: Super Rugby Final at Waikato Stadium, Hamilton:
 The  Chiefs crush the  Sharks 37–6 to claim their first-ever title.
 August 18 – October 6: The Rugby Championship
  win the title with a clean sweep in the first season of the newly renamed competition, now including Argentina. Including the competition's previous history as the Tri Nations, this is the All Blacks' 11th series win.

Domestic competitions
  English Premiership Final, May 26 at Twickenham:
 Harlequins defeat Leicester Tigers 30–23 to claim their first Premiership title. Quins had also finished atop the league table.
 RFU Championship Final, May 23 and May 30:
 London Welsh defeat Cornish Pirates 66–41 on aggregate to claim the title. London Welsh were initially denied a place in the Premiership due largely to stadium issues, but successfully appealed the denial, placing them in the Premiership for 2012–13 at the expense of bottom finisher Newcastle Falcons.
  Top 14 Final, June 9 at Stade de France, Saint-Denis:
 Toulouse defeat Toulon 18–12 and lift the Bouclier de Brennus for the 19th time.
 Rugby Pro D2 — Grenoble automatically promoted to Top 14 as champion. Mont-de-Marsan defeat Pau 29–20 in the playoff final to claim the second promotion place. These teams replace Brive and Lyon, which finished on the bottom of the Top 14 table.
     Pro12 Final, May 27 at RDS Arena, Dublin:
  Ospreys defeat  Leinster 31–30 to claim their fourth Celtic League/Pro12 title.
   LV Cup (Anglo-Welsh Cup) – Leicester Tigers
  ITM Cup
 Premiership Final, October 27 at Rugby League Park, Christchurch: Canterbury defeat Auckland 31–18 for their fifth consecutive provincial title.
 Championship Final, October 26 at ECOLight Stadium, Pukekohe: Counties Manukau defeat Otago 41–16 to claim their first title at any level of provincial rugby in 32 years. The Steelers are promoted to the 2013 ITM Premiership, replacing bottom-placed Hawke's Bay.
  Currie Cup Final, October 27 at Mr Price Kings Park, Durban:
 Western Province defeat  25–18 to claim their first Currie Cup title since 2001.

Ski mountaineering

Snowboarding

Squash

Sumo

Swimming

Tennis

Australian Open (January 16–29)
 Women's Singles: Victoria Azarenka defeated Maria Sharapova 6–3, 6–0.
 Men's Singles: Novak Djokovic defeated Rafael Nadal 5–7, 6–4, 6–2, 6–7(5–7), 7–5.
French Open (May 27 – June 11)
Women's Singles: Maria Sharapova defeated Sara Errani 6–3, 6–2.
Men's Singles: Rafael Nadal defeated Novak Djokovic 6–4, 6–3, 2–6, 7–5.
Wimbledon (June 25 – July 8)
Women's Singles: Serena Williams defeated Agnieszka Radwańska 6–1, 5–7, 6–2.
Men's Singles: Roger Federer defeated Andy Murray 4–6, 7–5, 6–3, 6–4.
Us Open (August 27 – September 9)
Women's Singles: Serena Williams defeated Victoria Azarenka  6–2, 2–6, 7–5.
Men's Singles: Andy Murray defeated Novak Djokovic 7–6 (10), 7–5, 2–6, 3–6, 6–2.
WTA Tour Championships at Istanbul, Turkey. October 23 - October 28
Serena Williams defeated Maria Sharapova 6-4, 6-3.
ATP World Tour Finals at London, United Kingdom. November 5 - November 11
Novak Djokovic defeated Roger Federer 7–6 (6), 7–5.
Davis Cup - the Czech Republic wins, defeating Spain in the final.
Fed Cup World Group - the Czech Republic wins, defeating Serbia in the final.

Volleyball
Men's CEV Champions League 2011–12
Women's CEV Champions League 2011–12
2012 FIVB World League
2012 FIVB World Grand Prix

Multi-sport events
 2012 Winter Youth Olympics January 13–22 in Innsbruck, Austria
 June 21 – June 24 – 2012 United World Games in Klagenfurt, Austria
 July 27 – August 12 – 2012 Summer Olympics in London, United Kingdom
 August 29 – September 9 – 2012 Summer Paralympics in London, United Kingdom
 2012 Asian Beach Games in Haiyang, China

See also 
International sports calendar 2012

References

 
Sports by year